Hultman is a Swedish surname.

Geographical distribution
As of 2014, 59.5% of all known bearers of the surname Hultman were residents of Sweden (frequency 1:3,059), 35.9% of the United States (1:186,212), 1.1% of Norway (1:82,941) and 1.0% of Finland (1:101,793).

In Sweden, the frequency of the surname was higher than national average (1:3,059) in the following counties:
 1. Jönköping County (1:1,427)
 2. Östergötland County (1:1,563)
 3. Kalmar County (1:1,818)
 4. Värmland County (1:1,927)
 5. Örebro County (1:2,228)
 6. Södermanland County (1:2,234)
 7. Västernorrland County (1:2,904)
 8. Västra Götaland County (1:2,966)

People
Calvin Hultman (1941–2017), American politician, son of Oscar
Emil Hultman (1880–?), Swedish politician
Evan Hultman (born 1925), American politician
Johan Hultman (1876–1958), Swedish diplomat
Johannes Alfred Hultman (1861–1942), Swedish evangelist, singer, musician, composer and publisher
Lars Hultman (born 1960), Swedish physicist
Oscar Hultman (1887–1969), American politician, father of Calvin
Vivian Hultman (1903–1987), American football player

See also
Hultman Aqueduct, an aqueduct in Massachusetts, United States

References

Swedish-language surnames